Paraserianthes lophantha (syn. Albizia lophantha), the Cape Leeuwin wattle, Bicol wattle, Cape wattle, crested wattle or plume albizia, is a fast-growing tree with creamy-yellow, bottlebrush like flowers. It is a small tree (uppermost height approximately 5 metres) that occurs naturally along the southwest coast of Western Australia, from Fremantle to King George Sound. It was first spread beyond southwest Australia by Baron Ferdinand von Mueller, who gave packets of P. lophantha seeds to early explorers under the assumption that if they planted the seeds at their campsites, the trees would indicate the routes they travelled.

It is considered a weed in the parts of Australia where it is not indigenous, as well as in New Zealand, South Africa, the Canary Islands, the Philippines and Chile.

Taxonomy

It was first described in 1806 as Acacia lophantha by Willdenow, but was transferred to the genus Paraserianthes by Nielsen, Guinet and Baretta-Kuipers in 1983.

See also
 Invasive species in Australia
 Invasive plants of Australian origin

References

Further reading
 
 

Mimosoids
Fabales of Australia
Rosids of Western Australia
Plants described in 1806